Svetlana Nikolaevna "Lanna" Saunders (December 22, 1941 – March 10, 2007) was an American actress, best known for her role as Marie Horton on the television soap opera Days of Our Lives, on which she appeared from 197985. She also played the characters Betty Andrews on the CBS daytime soap opera The Young and the Restless and Julie Evans on the NBC soap opera The Doctors in 1968.

Early years
Saunders was born on December 22, 1941, in New York City. Saunders's father was actor Nicholas Saunders and her grandfather was actor Nicholas Soussanin, who emigrated from the Ukrainian SSR in the 1920s, and married actress Olga Baclanova.

Career
Saunders started in acting at age 13, studying under Elia Kazan and later joining his Lincoln Center Company. Her credits on Broadway included Philadelphia, Here I Come! (1966), The Changeling (1964), Never Live Over a Pretzel Factory (1964), Milk and Honey (1961), and Sunrise at Campobello (1958).

Personal life and death 
Saunders was married to Andre Yedigaroff.  She met her future husband, actor Lawrence Pressman, when she was a student of Kazan, and they were married until her death. Actor David Pressman is their son.

Saunders was diagnosed with multiple sclerosis in 1982 and she left Days of our Lives three years later when she became too ill to continue in the role. She died on March 10, 2007.

Filmography

References

External links

Los Angeles Times obituary on Saunders

1941 births
2007 deaths
American soap opera actresses
Actresses from New York City
American people of Russian descent
American stage actresses
American child actresses
Neurological disease deaths in California
Deaths from multiple sclerosis
20th-century American actresses
21st-century American women